Vääksy is a village and seat of the municipality of Asikkala in southern Finland.

The Vääksy canal, Vesijärven kanava, is located in Vääksy. Its length is 1,315 km and the height difference is 3.10±0.25 metres. Nowadays it is the most popular freshwater canal in Finland.

The canal was built during the great hunger years in 1869-71 and completed in 1903–06.

References

External links
 Vääksy canal page in Finnish Transport Infrastructure Agency cite

Villages in Finland
Asikkala
Geography of Päijät-Häme
Populated lakeshore places in Finland